"Angels and Monsters" is the fifth episode of the third season of the NBC superhero drama series Heroes and thirty-ninth episode overall. The episode aired on October 13, 2008.

Plot

Nathan and Tracy are in bed. Nathan gets out of bed and goes to the kitchen, where he finds Mr. Linderman waiting for him. Nathan believes Linderman is a hallucination, but Linderman claims to have been sent from a higher power to warn Nathan that Tracy was in danger.

Mohinder is in the park and approaches a drug dealer and asks for something to take the edge off. Mohinder then grabs him and takes the dealer himself. Maya comes to Mohinder's laboratory while he's gone and finds his neighbor alive in a cocoon. She tries to free him but Mohinder returns and attacks her.

In Sylar's cell, Peter grabs him and snaps his neck, then turns to see his mother at the observation window. He telekinetically grabs her and asks what other secrets she's hiding from him. As he starts to slice open her skull, Sylar recovers and telekinetically throws Peter against the cell window, rendering him unconscious. Noah Bennet arrives and tells Sylar to come with him because they have a lead on another Level 5 escapee.

Sandra Bennet has realized that Claire lied about going to a cheerleading retreat and that she is going after the Level 5 escapees. Meredith argues that Claire cannot die, but Sandra shows her a file on Stephen Canfield, who can create matter vortices that sucks up everything around, and suggests that anything and anyone will permanently disappear in Canfield's vortices, regardless of power. Meredith is persuaded, but is more worried by another escapee, Eric Doyle, who she says is horrible. She leaves to go after him, persuading Sandra to stay in the house. Stephen Canfield is at his former home on the phone with his sister, who refuses to tell him where his family is. She hangs up on him. Stephen gets angry and creates a vortex that sucks in a handful of small items before hearing footsteps, at which point Claire comes up from behind and tasers him.

After being released from his coffin, Adam chokes Hiro until he explains that they're looking for the missing formula.  However, he refuses to help until Hiro blackmails him by locking him in his coffin again until he agrees.

Linderman meets with Daphne at the Pinehearst Company and wants to have her join a new group of special individuals that he's assembling. She agrees as long as she's paid, and he hands her a file containing photos of the people she needs to recruit, including Knox and Mohinder.

Canfield disarms Claire and explains that he only made one mistake, accidentally killing his neighbor in an argument. He discovers that she is not working with Primatech or Pinehearst. He then explains that the Company locked him away with no lawyer and no trial and all he wants is a normal life. Sympathizing, Claire offers to help him find his family. She uses the Company files to locate Canfield's wife and children. He calls his wife and sets up a meeting at the Griffith Park Carousel. Suddenly Noah and Sylar burst in with their guns ready. Canfield creates a large vortex, pulling everything to the center of the room and makes his escape. Sylar rescues Claire from the vortex and tries to apologize to Claire, as, by touching her hand from holding her back from the vortex, he saw how much pain and terror he had caused her, but she won't have it, and Noah forbids Sylar to speak to her.

Tracy admits to Nathan that she killed a reporter by accident in Washington D.C. She wants to turn herself in but he warns that no one will believe her claim, and reminds her that he was shot when he tried to go public with his ability. He lets her know his belief that God gave him his powers. Tracy tells him that she got her powers from experimentation by Dr. Zimmerman.

Adam takes Hiro and Ando to a bar where persons with special abilities can be hired. The bartender attacks Adam for having an affair with his wife but knocks out Hiro by mistake, then chases Adam out of the bar. Hiro and Ando try to find Adam without success. As they go down an alleyway, behind them, Knox knocks Adam out and puts him in a van. Daphne and Knox then enter the bar where Hiro and Ando are drinking. They offer Hiro a job at Pinehearst Industries. However, Knox has a sword, which he gives to Hiro, saying that he can only join on the condition that he kills Ando. After apologizing sadly to Ando and telling him that this is necessary to save the world, Hiro appears to fatally stab him with a sword, Daphne reacts with shock and Ando seems to die.

Nathan and Tracy go to the Company facility where Angela is keeping Peter sedated. She explains that Zimmerman helped the Company develop a synthetic ability drug and that Tracy, her sisters Niki Sanders and Barbara, and Nathan were among his test subjects. Angela explains that since his father was disappointed that Nathan didn't have the genetic code for special powers, he authorized experimentation on Nathan. The decision was based on the assumption that since everybody else in the Petrelli family had powers, Nathan's body should be able to take it. Angela apologizes for the experiments on Tracy and says they tried to make amends by splitting the formula in half so no one could recreate it. However, Nathan reproaches her apology and leaves with Tracy. Nathan suggests that he and Tracy go to Mohinder for help. At his lab, Mohinder encases Maya in a cocoon when she discovers his disturbing secret.

Claire goes to Griffith Park where Canfield plans to meet his wife. He tells her that his wife never showed up and admits his family are afraid of him. Noah arrives, holds Canfield at gunpoint, and makes him a deal: if Canfield kills Sylar, then Noah will let him go. Instead, he states that he does not want to "be a monster" and creates a vortex to suck himself in. Noah drives Claire home, explaining that he did what he had to do to protect his family. Sylar suggests to Claire that Noah is a user who doesn't consider either one of them human beings. However, Claire calls Sylar a monster when out of earshot and seems to believe Noah. Claire goes inside and Sandra greets her, glad that Meredith found her; Claire responds with "Meredith?" In a house filled with puppets, Meredith is seated at a table eating spaghetti with Eric Doyle. He controls her, forcing her to eat her food and then to kiss him.

Angela has a vision in which Nathan, Peter and Tracy are killed. A man wearing a ring grabs her and says that he can't have her seeing the future. She insists that she will stop him, but he tells her that she won't even be able to move. Angela wakes up from her dream, paralyzed.

Daphne runs to Pinehearst and informs Linderman that she's recruited everyone, including Hiro. She feels uneasy about the apparent murder of Ando but Linderman shrugs it off saying that it's "all part of making the world a better place". He then tells Daphne there is one more person to recruit: Matt Parkman, describing him as the most difficult one of all. She waves her hand through Linderman, and realizes that he isn't really there. Despite this she still reluctantly agrees to seek out Matt. As she leaves, Linderman disappears, and Maury Parkman emerges from the shadows. Maury enters the Pinehearst building and enters a medical chamber. He telepathically talks to the man with the ring, hooked up to life support, confirming that he's following his orders to give Nathan visions of Linderman, and that Adam is well in hand. The episode finishes with him declaring; "Whatever you say goes, Mr. Petrelli."

Critical reception
Steve Heisler of The A.V. Club rated this episode a D+.

Robert Canning of IGN gave the episode 7.3 out of 10.

References

External links
 

Heroes (season 3) episodes
2008 American television episodes